Karl-Jean Longuet  (November 10, 1904 – July 20, 1981) was a French sculptor. He was the son of Jean Longuet, the grandson of Charles Longuet and the great-grandson of Karl Marx.

Longuet was married to the sculptor Simone Boisecq.

References

1904 births
1981 deaths
Art duos
French editorial cartoonists
French people of German-Jewish descent
20th-century French sculptors
École nationale supérieure des arts décoratifs alumni
Lycée Lakanal alumni